Payam Toos Khorasan Football Club (Bashgah-e Futbal-e Peyam Tus Xerasan) is an Iranian football club based in Mashhad, Razavi Khorasan. They compete in the 2nd Division. The club is more commonly known as Payam Mashhad when it was based in Mashhad from 1976 to May 2011. The club was moved to Nishapur from May to November 2011, however due to lack of support in Nishapur, the club moved back to Mashhad. In April 2013 Ali Sheykh Eslami bought Payam Imam Reza Football Club  and renamed the club "Payam Vahdat Khorasan Football Club". The re-founded club, Payam Khorasan F.C., was formed in July 2021, taking its name from the year of foundation of the predecessor club and securing a place in the 2020-21 2nd Division. Ex-head coach Younes Masoudi was appointed as president and former player Mohammad Babaei was chosen as head coach.

History

Establishment
The club was established in 1976 by Ali Shadiyan under the name "Soltan Tabarsi" and participated in the city of Mashhad's youth football leagues. Sometime in 1977, the name of the club changed to Mokhaberat Mashhad when new owner Javad Moradnejad revealed Ministry of Post and Telecommunications as sponsor of the club. In 1983 the club was renamed to Payam.

Glory years
In 1988, Payam became Khorasan Province Champions and thus made first appearance in Iran's top league Qods League. Payam then once again appeared in the top league for 1994/95.

After relegation in 1995, once again appeared in the top league and for first time ever two seasons back-to-back 1996/97 and 1997/98. Payam's team of 1996/97 is considered the golden team in Payam's history. In these years the team was coached by the great Majid Jalali and in addition to local star players such as Reza Sahebi, Majid Hosseinipour, Mehdi Vaezi, Ali Hanteh, several Iran national football team players and other star players featured for Payam including Nima Nakisa, Sattar Hamedani, Dariush Yazdani, Behzad Dadashzadeh, Shahram Baratpouri, Ali Chini and Ahmad Momenzadeh. However it got relegated at the end of 1997/98 season.

Iran Pro League
The club was promoted to the Persian Gulf Cup for the 2008–09 season and had a difficult season where they changed chairman three times and three coaches and had financial problems during the season. They finally lost the battle to their city rivals Aboomoslem and were relegated to the Azadegan League again.

Relocation to Nishapur
Due to the club's financial crisis, the club was docked three points at the end of the 2010–11 Azadegan League season and thus was relegated to 2nd Division. Parliamentarians and industries in Nishapur had promised financial support and a strong fan base if the team moved. Mahmoud Safaei chairman of the club decided to move the club to Nishapur. This move which lasted only six months from May 2011 to November 2011 was a disaster as the team did not receive the promised support, thus Khorasan Razavi FA took over ownership of the club and returned the club back to Mashhad.

Bankruptcy
In 2012, the club was unable to pay wages and had debts. The club's owner, Mahmoud Safaei, was able to raise some more money, but even this soon proved to be insufficient resources to sustain the club. Payam Mashhad were relegated to 3rd Division at the end of the 2011–12 season. This form of bankruptcy meant that the club was refused a place in 3rd Division for the 2012–13 season, and as a result effectively ceased to exist.

Refounded
At the beginning of the summer of
2013-14 season, Majid Khorrami bought the franchise of Esteghlal Sari football club and gave life to this old and popular name of Mashhad and entered the second division league under the name Payam Vahdat Khorasan Football Club with the financial support of 
Atrak Air.
In the second group of the competition, among 14 teams, it did not get a better than 8th rank.
Next season, with the support of Mahan Air, in the 2014-2015 Iran Football League Second Division, the first stage (second group) of the games, it won the sixth place in a situation where it was the half-season champion and failed to advance to the final stage to advance to the Azadegan League.
In start season 2015-16 with the disagreement between the club owner Majid Khorami and Ali Sheikhul-Islami, the management of the club was removed and Payam Vahdat to Kashmar made the team into the third league and its quota was sold to Persepolis Mashhad.

Mashhad Derby

The Mashhad derby also known as the Khorasan derby is a local football derby match between the two most popular clubs from Mashhad: Aboomoslem and Payam Mashhad. Back in the 1980s and early 1990s it was Iran's second most important derby after the Tehran derby. Nowadays it has lost its status to more popular derbies such as Esfahan derby, and the Ahvaz derby.

Payam Football Academy
Payam Football Academy was established on 16 April 2010, commenced work in June 2010 with 16 trainers and executive personnel. Team's captain Younes Masoudi was CEO of Payam Football Academy from June 2010 until May 2010.

Name history
The club has mostly been owned by Ministry of Post and Telecommunications. until 2007. However, throughout history, the team changed sponsors and thus was known by many names.

Soltan Tabarsi (1976–1977) – founded by Ali Shadiyan of Tabarsi Street in Mashhad.
Mokhaberat Mashhad (1977–1983) – owned by Javad Moradnejad & sponsored by Ministry of Post and Telecommunications.
Payam Mashhad (1983–1991) – in 1990/91 period Chelokabab Rezaei Restaurant was major sponsor.
Payam  Chin Chin Mashhad (1990–1991)- in 1990/91 period Chin Chin Company was major sponsor.
Payam  Azadegan Mashhad (1991–1992)
Payam Gach Khorasan (1992–1996) – major sponsor was Khorasan Gypsum Ltd.
Payam Moghavemat Mashhad (1996–1998) – major sponsor was Islamic Revolutionary Guard Corps
Payam Mokhaberat Mashhad (1998–2000)
Payam Peykan Mashhad (2000–2003) – major sponsor was Iran Khodro and club was managed by Paykan Tehran F.C.
Payam Post Mashhad (2003–2005) – major sponsor was Iran Post
Payam Ertebatat Mashhad (2005–2007)
Payam Mi Si Noo (2007) – briefly from July to December 2007, Payam Soccer Team was owned by Mehregan Sharq Cultural and Sport Club.
Payam Khorasan Razavi (2008–2010)
Payam Imam Reza  (2010–2012)
Payam Vahdat Khorasan  (2013–2016)
Payam Toos Khorasan  (2021–Present)

Logo history

Club stadium
Before the construction of Samen Al-Aeme Stadium, Payam played all of its matches at Takhti Stadium (Mashhad), which currently has a capacity of 15,000. They occasionally play big games at Samen Al-Aeme Stadium.

Sponsors
Since establishment to present day, sponsors of the club have included Ministry of Post and Telecommunications, Iran Khodro, Basij, Toos Gypsum Co, Iran Post, Dariush Grand Hotel, Chin Chin Company, Chelokabab Rezaei Restaurant and Tabarrok Rice.

Club Chairman

Ali Soltan (1976–1977)
Javad Moradnejad (1977–1989)
Hossein Zarrabi (1989–1990)
Dr. Khorrami (1990–1991)
Naeemi (1991–1992)
Mehdi Najmi
Hossein Zarrabi
Ali Soltan
Hashem Hosseini
Hossein Izadi
Sardar Yaghoubi
Dr. Ouraei
Reza Mohammadi (2005–06)
Gholam Asghari (2006–07
Majid Toosi (2007 – December 7)
Mostafa Bani-Asad (December 2007)
Ali Sallahi (December 2007 – December 8)
Rahman Naderi (December 2008 – January 9)
Javad Izadi (January 2009 – June 9)
Ali Sallahi (June 2009 – May 10)
Mahmoud Safaei
Ali Shekholleslami (June 2013–January 2017)
Younes Masoudi (2021–Present)

Head coaches

Hashem Rahbardar (1976–77)
Javad Moradnejad (1977–82)
Khademolreza (1982–83)
Javad Qorab (1983–84)
Qasem Zardkanloo (1984–85)
Hashem Rahbardar (1985)
Qasem Zardkanloo (1985–86)
Hashem Rahbardar (1986–1989)
Qasem Zardkanloo (1990)
Hashem Rahbardar (1990–91)
Qasem Zardkanloo (1991–92)
Hasan Ghasemi (1992–93)
Seyed Mehdi Qiyassi (1993–94)
Seyed Kazem Ghiyassian (1994–95)
Mehdi Dinvarzadeh (1995–96)
Majid Jalali (1996–98)
Ali ZadAli (1998)
Hossein Fekri (1998)
Qasem Zardkanloo (1999)
Akbar Misaghian (1999-02)
Reza Vatankhah (2002–04)
Nader Dastneshan (2004–05)
Abbas Chamanyan (2005)
Morteza Vahedolein
Younes Masoudi (2005–06)
Hashem Rahbardar (2006–07)
Abbas Chamanyan (2007–13 November 07)
Seyed Ali Hoseini (14 November 2007–10 December 07) (Caretaker)
Ali Hanteh (11 December 2007-8 March 08)
Hamed Khoshnevis (9 March 2008–21 June 08)
Mojtaba Asghari (22 June 2008–12 December 08)
Abbas Chamanyan (18 December 2008 – January 9)
Rahim Tajik (January 2009 – February 9)
Seyed Kazem Ghiyassian (February 2009 – May 9)
Ali Hanteh (July 2009 – March 10)
Davoud Mahabadi (March 2010 – June 10)
Reza Sahebi (June 2010–22 July 10)
Abbas Chamanyan (23 July 2010–20 February 11)
ALi Kafi (20 February 2011 – 10 March 2011)
Abbas Chamanian (11 March 2011 – June 2011)
Reza Ahadi (19 June 2011 – July 2011)
Abbas Dehghani (July 2011 – October 2011)
Abbas Chamanian (November 2011) (Caretaker)
Reza Sahebi (November 2011 – December 2011)
Abbas Dehghani (January 2012–)
Hashem Rahbardar (June 2013 – February 2014)
Abbas Akbari (February 2014 – August 2014)
Hiva Hoseinzade  (August 2014 – September 2014)
Javad Malek Jafarian  (September 2014 – July 2015)
Abbas Chamanian  (July 2015–October 2015)
Abbas Chamanian  (October 2015–January 2016)
Ali Bakhshi  (January 2016-January 2017)
Hamid Tahmasbi  (January 2017)
Mohammad Babaei (July 2021–January 2022)
Hassan Sourouri (January 2022–April 2022)
Abbas Sharif (April 2022–Present)

Season-by-season
The table below chronicles the achievements of Payam Mashhad in various competitions since 1984.

Honours

Mashhad Football League
Runner-Up: 1985–86

Khorasan Football League
Champion: 1986–87, 1988–89, 1991–92
Runner-Up: 1987–88

2nd Division
Runner-Up: 1995–96

Azadegan League
Champion: 2007–08
2nd Group B: 2004–05

Players

First-team squad
The composition of the team in the season 2021-22
Note: The flags represent the national team as defined by FIFA eligibility rules. Players may have more than one non-FIFA nationality.

References

External links
  Official club website

Football clubs in Iran
Association football clubs established in 1976
1976 establishments in Iran
Sport in Mashhad